Polyacanthia fonscolombei is a species of beetle in the family Cerambycidae. It was described by Xavier Montrouzier in 1861.

Subspecies
 Polyacanthia fonscolombei fonscolombei Montrouzier, 1861
 Polyacanthia fonscolombei hebridarum Breuning, 1950

References

Pogonocherini
Beetles described in 1861